Egil Storbekken (25 November 1911 – 19 March 2002) was a Norwegian folk musician, composer and instrument maker. He was born in Tolga, Hedmark. Storbekken is particularly known for his development of the tussefløyte, a Norwegian version of the recorder. His radio debut with this instrument came in 1952. Notable among his compositions is the well received "Fjelltrall" from 1960.

References

1911 births
2002 deaths
Musicians from Tolga, Norway
Norwegian folk musicians
Norwegian composers
Norwegian male composers
Members of Nasjonal Samling
People convicted of treason for Nazi Germany against Norway
20th-century Norwegian male musicians